Anatoly Sultanovich Kyarov (10 November 1957  12 January 2008) was the head of the Russia's Kabardino-Balkaria republic's UBOP (Unit for Fighting Organized Crime). He and his UBOP squad were accused of serious human rights abuses within Kabardino-Balkaria, including of torture and murder.

Kyarov was assassinated on January 12, 2008, in Nalchik together with a senior officer of the OMON special forces, while two other police officers were wounded in the attack. The local Islamist insurgent group Yarmuk Jamaat was seen as responsible for the assassination (its leader, Anzor Astemirov, have previously survived many assassination attempts himself by Kyarov and his men).

References

2008 deaths
Assassinated Russian people
Deaths by firearm in Russia
People murdered in Russia
People of the Chechen wars
Russian police officers
Heroes of the Russian Federation
1957 births